In topology and related areas of mathematics, the set of all possible topologies on a given set forms a partially ordered set. This order relation can be used for comparison of the topologies.

Definition 
A topology on a set may be defined as the collection of subsets which are considered to be "open". An alternative definition is that it is the collection of subsets which are considered "closed". These two ways of defining the topology are essentially equivalent because the complement of an open set is closed and vice versa. In the following, it doesn't matter which definition is used.

Let τ1 and τ2 be two topologies on a set X such that τ1 is contained in τ2:
.
That is, every element of τ1 is also an element of τ2. Then the topology τ1 is said to be a coarser (weaker or smaller) topology than τ2, and  τ2 is said to be a finer (stronger or larger) topology than τ1.

If additionally 

we say τ1 is strictly coarser than  τ2 and τ2 is strictly finer than τ1.

The binary relation ⊆ defines a partial ordering relation on the set of all possible topologies on X.

Examples 

The finest topology on X is the discrete topology; this topology makes all subsets open.  The coarsest topology on X is the trivial topology; this topology only admits the empty set
and the whole space as open sets.

In function spaces and spaces of measures there are often a number of possible topologies. See topologies on the set of operators on a Hilbert space for some intricate relationships.

All possible polar topologies on a dual pair are finer than the weak topology and coarser than the strong topology.

The complex vector space Cn may be equipped with either its usual (Euclidean) topology, or its Zariski topology. In the latter, a subset V of Cn is closed if and only if it consists of all solutions to some system of polynomial equations. Since any such V also is a closed set in the ordinary sense, but not vice versa, the Zariski topology is strictly weaker than the ordinary one.

Properties 

Let τ1 and τ2 be two topologies on a set X. Then the following statements are equivalent:
 τ1 ⊆ τ2
 the identity map idX : (X, τ2) → (X, τ1) is a continuous map.
 the identity map idX : (X, τ1) → (X, τ2) is a strongly/relatively open map.

(The identity map idX is surjective and therefore it is strongly open if and only if it is relatively open.)

Two immediate corollaries of the above equivalent statements are
A continuous map f : X → Y remains continuous if the topology on Y becomes coarser or the topology on X finer.
An open (resp. closed) map f : X → Y remains open (resp. closed) if the topology on Y becomes finer or the topology on X coarser.

One can also compare topologies using neighborhood bases. Let τ1 and τ2 be two topologies on a set X and let Bi(x) be a local base for the topology τi at x ∈ X for i = 1,2. Then τ1 ⊆ τ2 if and only if for all x ∈ X, each open set U1 in B1(x) contains some open set U2 in B2(x). Intuitively, this makes sense: a finer topology should have smaller neighborhoods.

Lattice of topologies

The set of all topologies on a set X together with the partial ordering relation ⊆ forms a complete lattice that is also closed under arbitrary intersections.  That is, any collection of topologies on X have a meet (or infimum) and a join (or supremum). The meet of a collection of topologies is the intersection of those topologies. The join, however, is not generally the union of those topologies (the union of two topologies need not be a topology) but rather the topology generated by the union.

Every complete lattice is also a bounded lattice, which is to say that it has a greatest and least element. In the case of topologies, the greatest element is the discrete topology and the least element is the trivial topology.

Notes

See also 

 Initial topology, the coarsest topology on a set to make a family of mappings from that set continuous
 Final topology, the finest topology on a set to make a family of mappings into that set continuous

References

General topology
Topologies